Laws of Gravity is an album by The Infamous Stringdusters that won the Grammy Award for Best Bluegrass Album in the 60th Annual Grammy Awards in 2018. It was released on Compass Records in 2017.

Track listing

References

External links
 

2017 albums
The Infamous Stringdusters albums
Compass Records albums